John Mack Faragher (born Phoenix, Arizona) is an American historian.

Life
Born in 1945, he was raised in southern California, the oldest of eight children.  Several of his siblings have been in the music business, including Danny Faragher, Jimmy Faragher, Tommy Faragher, Davey Faragher, Pammy Faragher, and Marty Faragher.  He graduated from the University of California, Riverside in 1967, did social work for several years, then graduated from Yale University with a Ph.D. in 1977. 
He taught at Mount Holyoke College from 1978 to 1993; then at Yale University from 1993 until his retirement as Howard R. Lamar Professor Emeritus of History and American Studies in 2016.  With Mari Jo Buhle, Daniel Czitrom, and Susan Armitage he is author of Out of Many, A History of the American People.

Awards
 1980 Frederick Jackson Turner Award of the Organization of American Historians for Women and Men on the Overland Trail
 1987 Annual Book Prize, Society for Historians of the Early American Republic for Sugar Creek
 1993 Los Angeles Times Book Prize for Biography for Daniel Boone
 1995 Governor's Award, State of Kentucky, for Daniel Boone
 2001 Caughey Western History Association Prize for the Best Book in Western History, for The American West
 2000 Western Heritage Award, National Cowboy & Western Heritage Museum, for The American West
 2017 Norman Neuerburg Award, Historical Society of Southern California, for Eternity Street

Works
      (reprint 2001)

References

21st-century American historians
American male non-fiction writers
University of California, Riverside alumni
Yale University alumni
Mount Holyoke College faculty
Yale University faculty
Living people
Acadian history
Deportation
Historians of the American Revolution
Year of birth missing (living people)
21st-century American male writers